Soe Min Kodawgyi was the chief queen consort of Sagaing from 1352 to 1364. The eldest daughter of the founder of Sagaing Saw Yun was a powerful figure who twice led diplomatic missions to forge a closer alliance with Pinya in the 1350s. She was the mother of Thado Minbya, the founder of the Kingdom of Ava.

Brief
Soe Min was the eldest child and the only daughter of Queen Saw Hnaung and King Saw Yun of Sagaing. She was born in 1322 or earlier. By 1335/36, she had been married to Thado Hsinhtein of Tagaung, the scion of Tagaung, a key vassal state of Sagaing. The couple, along with her three siblings, had to flee Sagaing in 1335/36 when her half-cousin Shwetaungtet seized the throne. They spent the next three years in Mindon, deep inside the neighboring kingdom of Pinya.

The couple returned to Sagaing in 1339 when her eldest younger brother Kyaswa became king of Sagaing. After giving birth to a son and two daughters in the following decade, the princess became increasingly involved in the affairs of the state. In 1351, during the reign of her youngest brother Tarabya II, the princess and her husband met with her second cousin King Kyawswa II of Pinya, and negotiated a truce. She soon became the kingmaker in February 1352 when Tarabya II died, leaving no heirs. Because her husband had also recently died, she married Thihapate, a court official descended from the Pagan royalty, who became the next king. She became Thihapate's chief queen; they had a daughter, Saw Taw Oo.

When the northern Shan state of Mong Mao (Maw) began raiding Sagaing territory, she sought a closer alliance with Pinya. In 1357/58, she sent her eldest daughter Shin Saw Gyi to Kyawswa II in a marriage of state, but the alliance yielded no discernible benefit as Kyawswa II could not muster enough manpower to assist Sagaing. After a devastating raid by the Maw Shans in 1358−59, Pinya's new king Narathu withdrew from the alliance.

Soe Min became the queen dowager in 1364 when her eldest child Thado Minbya overthrew Thihapate. Her three daughters all became queens of Swa Saw Ke who succeeded Thado Minbya.

Ancestry

Notes

Citations

Bibliography

Myinsaing dynasty
Queens consort of Sagaing